The southern Appalachian salamander (Plethodon teyahalee) is a species of salamander in the family Plethodontidae.

Distribution
P. teyahalee is endemic to the southern Appalachian Mountains in the Southeastern United States, where it is found within the states of Georgia, South Carolina, North Carolina, and Tennessee. The salamander's altitudinal range extends to 1,550 m. Its natural habitat is temperate Appalachian forests.

The species is threatened by habitat loss.

References

External links

Plethodon
Salamander, Southern Appalachian
Ecology of the Appalachian Mountains
Endemic fauna of the United States
Salamander, Southern Appalachian
Natural history of the Great Smoky Mountains
Natural history of South Carolina
Taxonomy articles created by Polbot
Amphibians described in 1983